Queens Park Community School (commonly abbreviated to QPCS) is a secondary school and sixth form with academy status, located in Queen's Park, north west London, in the borough of Brent, England.

Admissions
There are, as of December 2020, 1286 pupils aged between 11 and 19 on roll who come from a range of backgrounds. QPCS is situated south of the A4003, in Brondesbury Park, about a mile west of Kilburn. The closest bus stations are Okehampton Road and Hanover Road, whilst the closest train station is Kensal Rise (which serves for the Overground).

History

Merger
Opened in 1989, Queens Park Community School is the result of an amalgamation of three schools during the 1980s. The three schools that were merged were South Kilburn High School (formally Percy Road School), Aylestone Community School and Brondesbury and Kilburn High (commonly abbreviated to B&K). The latter was formed from the merger in 1973 of Kilburn Senior High School for Boys (KSH), and Brondesbury and Kilburn High School for Girls (BKHS). Both were successors to state grammar schools which were abolished by the local authority in 1967, the boys' grammar school being Kilburn Grammar School. The new school's logo, an image of three trees, represents this union of the three local secondary schools. The headteacher chosen to head the new school was Mary Norton. Norton headed the school from its formation through to her retirement from education in 2002.

Present-day QPCS

The school had a new block funded through the millennium National Lottery fund at an estimated cost of £34.3 million. The building of this block involved demolishing one of the existing buildings. The new building was opened by Ken Livingstone with a plaque commemorating his visit. The school has been granted specialist school status in Business and Enterprise.

QPCS secured additional funding through the government's Excellence in Cities programme, which provided resources for schools, to provide extended activities and work for gifted and talented pupils.

In March 2012, QPCS applied for Artsmark status – it received the Gold award.

Queens Park Community School converted to academy status in September 2012.

QPCS City Learning Centre

The QPCS City Learning Centre (CLC) was one of 105 CLCs built by the DfES throughout the country.  It was completed in 2003.

In 2015, funding for CLCs ceased and the CLC building has become part of the school’s teaching accommodation.

Teachers' awards
QPCS teaching staff that have received recognition in the National Teaching Awards:
Sue Wales won the Lifetime Achievement Teaching Award for London and the Southeast of England in 2001.
Luna Rupchand won Teacher Support of the Year, at the ACE Project Diamond Ball Awards in November 2012.

QPCS in the media

Robert Symons
QPCS was featured in the media in 2004 as the school at which Robert Symons, who left his high-paid job to give back to his community, taught as a newly qualified teacher. Robert Symons was murdered in his home in October 2004 defending his family from Yousef Bouhaddaou when Yousef attempted to rob his house.

Classroom Chaos
QPCS was also one of the six schools featured on the 2005 Channel 5 programme Classroom Chaos in which a retired teacher under the pseudonym 'Sylvia Thomas' returned undercover as a supply teacher after 30 years. Her stated objective was to show the 'chaos' which teachers must deal with in the modern classroom. With the use of hidden cameras, she filmed chairs being thrown, pupils fighting in class and swearing at teachers and other such behaviour.

Notable former pupils

 Tafari Moore
 Osman Kakay
 Maria Lawson, R&B singer and X-Factor, 2004 finalist
 Seal (musician)  
 Paul Merson 
 Dominic Thompson (footballer)
 Caleb Watts

Brondesbury and Kilburn High School
 Julie Covington, singer, notably of Don't Cry for Me Argentina
 Margery Hurst OBE, founder and Managing Director from 1947-76 of Brook Street Bureau
 Doreen Miller, Baroness Miller of Hendon
 Twiggy

South Kilburn High School
 Ngozi Fulani, charity executive

References

External links
  Official QPCS Site
 Official CLC Site

Educational institutions established in 1989
Secondary schools in the London Borough of Brent
1989 establishments in England
Academies in the London Borough of Brent